Cestonioptera is a genus of bristle flies in the family Tachinidae.

Species
Cestonioptera mesnili Villeneuve, 1939

Distribution
Israel, Tunisia.

References

Exoristinae
Tachinidae genera
Monotypic Brachycera genera
Diptera of Asia
Diptera of Africa
Taxa named by Joseph Villeneuve de Janti